The women's 3000 metres steeplechase event at the 2019 African Games was held on 28 August in Rabat.

Results

References

3000
2019 in women's athletics